Song Sun (born in 1987) is a Chinese mathematician whose research concerns geometry and topology. A Sloan Research Fellow, he is a professor at the Department of Mathematics of the University of California, Berkeley, where he has been since 2018. In 2019, he was awarded the Oswald Veblen Prize in Geometry.

Biography 
Sun attended Huaining High School in Huaining County, Anhui, China, before being admitted to the Special Class for the Gifted Young at the University of Science and Technology of China in 2002. After graduating from the program with a B.S. in 2006, he moved to the United States to pursue graduate studies at the University of Wisconsin, obtaining his Ph.D in mathematics (differential geometry) in 2010. His doctoral advisor was Xiuxiong Chen, and his dissertation was titled "Kempf–Ness theorem and uniqueness of extremal metrics".

Sun worked as a research associate at Imperial College London before becoming an assistant professor at Stony Brook University in 2013. He was awarded the Sloan Research Fellowship in 2014. In 2018, he was appointed an associate professor at the Department of Mathematics of the University of California, Berkeley.

He was an invited speaker at the 2018 International Congress of Mathematicians, in Rio de Janeiro. For 2021 he received the Breakthrough Prize in Mathematics – New Horizons in Mathematics.

Conjecture on Fano manifolds and Veblen Prize 
In 2019, Sun was awarded the prestigious Oswald Veblen Prize in Geometry, together with his former advisor Xiuxiong Chen and Simon Donaldson, for proving a long-standing conjecture on Fano manifolds, which states that "a Fano manifold admits a Kähler–Einstein metric if and only if it is K-stable". It had been one of the most actively investigated topics in geometry since a rough version of it was conjectured in the 1980s by Shing-Tung Yau, who had previously proved the Calabi conjecture. The conjecture was later given a precise formulation by  Donaldson, based in part  on earlier work of Gang Tian. The solution by Chen, Donaldson and Sun was published in the Journal of the American Mathematical Society in 2015 as a three-article series, "Kähler–Einstein metrics on Fano manifolds, I, II and III".

Major publications

References 

Living people
21st-century Chinese mathematicians
Differential geometers
University of California, Berkeley faculty
University of Science and Technology of China alumni
 University of Wisconsin–Madison College of Letters and Science alumni
Academics of Imperial College London
Stony Brook University faculty
Mathematicians from Anhui
People from Huaining County
Year of birth missing (living people)
Sloan Research Fellows